Hearts Aflame is a 1923 American silent melodrama film directed by Reginald Barker and starring Frank Keenan, Anna Q. Nilsson, and Craig Ward. The son of a retired timber baron meets and falls in love with a Michigan woman who refuses to sell her land unless the buyer promises to replant to replace the trees that are to be cut down.

Plot
As described in a film magazine, retired millionaire lumberman Luke Taylor (Keenan) sends his son John (Ward) to Michigan to salvage some logs. While John is there he meets Helen Foraker (Nilsson), who owns a vast amount of uncut timber but refuses to sell unless the purchaser consents to replant the trees. Her forests were left to her by her father who planted them and she seeks to carry out his wish. Jim Harris (Heck), an unscrupulous land dealer, tries to force her to sell the land without this provision. John wires his father to come. The old man insists on buying the land, but also refuses to replant any cuttings. Jim again attempts to get the property for himself and likewise is refused by Helen, so he bribes a half-wit into setting the forest afire. John discovers the fire and rushes to aid. He and Helen take a logging train engine and succeed in bring through some explosives. The men work all night and finally the ridge is blown up, saving half the forest. John then not only agrees to replant the forest, but also to lend Helen any amount of money she needs and gives the two lovers his blessing.

Cast

 Frank Keenan as Luke Taylor
 Anna Q. Nilsson as Helen Foraker
 Craig Ward as John Taylor
 Richard Headrick as Bobby Kildare
 Russell Simpson as Black Joe
 Richard Tucker as Philip Rowe
 Stanton Heck as Jim Harris
 Martha Mattox as Aunty May
 Walt Whitman as Charley Stump
 Joan Standing as Ginger
 Ralph Cloninger as Thad Parker
 Lee Shumway as Milt Goddard
 John Dill as Lucius Kildare
 Gordon Magee as Sheriff (as Gordon McGee)
 Irene Hunt as Jennie Parker

Production
Production started in early July 1922.

On August 28, a stunt went terribly awry in the Kootenays, British Columbia. "A six acre plot of ground was soaked with 700 gallons of gasoline and set afire for a scene in which Miss Nilsson was to drive a locomotive through the flames." Nilsson was severely burned and required a week to recuperate. Craig Ward and cameraman Percy Hilburn, filming from "an asbestos cabinet built on the side of the locomotive", were also injured.

Preservation status
Hearts Aflame is now a lost film.

References

External links

1923 films
American black-and-white films
Silent American drama films
American silent feature films
Films based on American novels
Films directed by Reginald Barker
Films set in Michigan
Films shot in British Columbia
Lost American films
1923 drama films
Melodrama films
Metro Pictures films
1923 lost films
Lost drama films
1920s American films